Dura is a recently extinct language of Nepal. It has been classified in the West Bodish branch of Tibetan languages, though more recent work separates it out as an independent branch of Sino-Tibetan. Many of the Dura have switched to speaking Nepali, and the Dura language has sometimes been thought to be extinct. Some of the people who have switched to Nepali for their daily speech still use Dura for prayer.

The Himalayan Languages Project is working on recording additional knowledge of Dura.   Around 1,500 words and 250 sentences in Dura have been recorded.  The last known speaker of the language was the 82-year-old Soma Devi Dura.

Classification
Schorer (2016:293) classifies Dura as part of his newly proposed Greater Magaric branch.

Distribution
The ethnic Dura people mostly live in Lamjung District, with some in neighboring Tanahu District of Gandaki Province in central Nepal. They mostly live on farms in the hilly countryside. Different recent census counts have reported the number of Dura people anywhere from 3,397 to 5,676.

Dura villages include:

बाँग्रे Bāṅgre
बेसी बाँग्रे Besī Bāṅgre
बेसी फाँट Besī Phā̃ṫ
सिन्दुरे Sindure
धुसेनी Dhusenī
नस्के Naske (Dura majority)
नेटा Neṭā
चन्दि गाउँ Candigāũ
भाँगु Bhāṅgu
मालिङ Māliṅ
आरीकोसे Ārīkose
ठूलो स्वाँरा Ṭhūlo Svā̃rā (Dura majority)
खजे गाउँ Khaje Gāũ
तुर्लुङ Turluṅ (Dura majority)
तान्द्राङ्कोट Tāndrāṅkoṫ
Kunchha
Bhorletar

Other ethnic groups in the Dura region include the Gurung, Brahmins, Chetrīs, Kāmī, and Damāi.

Tandrange
A closely related language variety called Tandrange (Nepali: Tāndrāṅe; IPA: tandraŋe) is spoken in a few Gurung villages. Tandrange is spoken in the villages of Tāndrāṅ तान्द्राङ, Pokharī Thok पोखरी थोक, and Jītā जीता. However, Tandrange speakers adamantly consider themselves as not related to the stigmatized Dura people.

Reconstruction
Schorer (2016:286-287) reconstructs the following Proto-Dura words.
 *hāyu ‘blood’
 *cʰiũŋ ‘cold’
 *kim ‘house’
 *ti ‘water’
 *krut ‘hand’
 *kyu ‘stomach’
 *yāku ‘night’
 *mamī ‘sun’
 *lām- ‘path’
 *luŋ ‘stone’
 *daŋ- ‘to see’
 *rā- ‘to come’
 *khāC- ‘to go’
 *yʱā ‘to give’
 *cʰi- ‘to say’

Vocabulary
Schorer (2016:126-127) provides the following 125-word Swadesh list of Dura.

Numerals
Dura numerals are (Schorer 2016:146-147):
0. liŋa
1. nām, kyau, di-
2. jʰim
3. sām
4. pim
5. kum
6. cyām (Indo-Aryan loanword)
7. syām (Indo-Aryan loanword)
8. him
9. tum
10. tʰim
20. jʰim-tʰī
30. sām-tʰī
100. tʰiŋganā, kātʰerāgo
1,000. jena

See also
Dura word list (Wiktionary)
Schorer, Nicolas. 2016. The Dura Language: Grammar and Phylogeny. Leiden: Brill. https://brill.com/view/title/33670
Pons, Marie-Caroline. 2021. Review: The Dura language: Grammar and phylogeny. Himalayan Linguistics, 20(1). http://dx.doi.org/10.5070/H920155279

References

External links
The last of Nepal's Dura speakers BBC news story

Languages of Nepal
Magaric languages
Extinct languages of Asia
Languages extinct in the 2010s
2010s disestablishments in Nepal
Languages of Gandaki Province